The Khamenei family (Persian: خاندان خامنه‌ای) or Khamenei dynasty is among the Iranian Azeri Sayyid families who claim to be descendants of the fourth Imam of Shia Islam, Ali ibn Husayn Zayn al-Abidin (Persian/Arabic: علی بن حسین، زین العابدین) (known as Imam Sajjad) — according to the "Khamenei family tree". Their dwelling place(s) were/are in Azerbaijan (Iran), Najaf, Tafresh, etc.

Seyyed Ali Khamenei, the Supreme Leader of Iran, is the most powerful member of the Khamenei political family. His descent, known as "Sadat-e Hosseini", is likewise connected to the third Shia Imam, Hussain ibn Ali. An Al-Manar TV documentary broadcast in March 2020 claimed that Khamenei is the 38th descendant of the Islamic prophet Muhammad by his son Hussain Asghar, a son of Imam Sajjad.

Seyyed Ali Khamenei's father was Seyyed Javad Khamenei, and his paternal grandfather was Seyyed Hussein, who was buried in Najaf, Iraq (in the Wadi-us-Salaam cemetery). Seyyed Hussein's father was Seyyed Mohammad Hosseini Tafresshi, who was considered a Sayyid of Aftasi, whose family tree was connected to Sultan-al-Ulama Ahmad (also known as Seyyed Ahmad).

Seyyed Mohammad Hosseini Tafreshi Khamenei Tabrizi (Persian: سید محمد حسینی تفرشی خامنه‌ای تبریزی) was the son of Seyyed Mohamad Taghi, who was the son of Mirza Ali-Akbar, who was the son of Seyyed Fakhr-al-Din Tafreshi. The descendants of Seyyed Fakhr-al-Din (also known as Mir-Fakhra) are called Mir-Fakhrayi.

See also

Islamic articles
 Sayyid
 Family tree of Ali
 Ali Khamenei
 Javad Khamenei
 Mohammad Khiabani

Related
 Kim family (North Korea)
 Politics of Iran

References

Husaynids
Iranian Azerbaijanis
Political families of Iran
Ali Khamenei